Sovereign Yachts was an American boat builder based in Port Richey, Florida. The company specialized in the design and manufacture of fiberglass sailboats.

The company was founded by Doug Steeg in 1978 and closed in 1998.

History
Steeg started the company in 1978 and produced a line of sailboats that included the Sovereign 17, Sovereign 7.0 and the Antares 17. The company went out of business after ten years, in 1988.

The company did not name who their designers were for many of their boats, like the Sovereign 17 and credited them as the "Sovereign Design Group".

Custom Fiberglass Products of Florida (CFPF) was founded by Robbie Bowen and built fiberglass boat components for other builders under contract, including decks liners and hulls for Captiva Yachts and Sovereign Yachts. When Sovereign Yachts ceased business in 1988, CFPF bought the assets, including ownership of the hull molds and started producing the boats, under the Sovereign Yachts name, the former company essentially becoming a brand. The existing boats were sold under a variety of new designations and with minor changes from year to year. The Sovereign 20 was added to the product line. In 1992 the small cruising boats designed by Reuban Trane were also added, including his Peep Hen, Mud Hen and Bay Hen 21.

CFPF went out of business in 1994, but one of their salesmen, Terry Chapman, bought the molds and the rights to the designs. In 1996 he started a new company to produce the boats, Sovereign 96. The company quickly encountered financial issues and was bought out by Jim MacDougald that same year. He founded Sovereign America, Inc to produce the designs.

Sovereign America, Inc lasted two years, going out of business in 1998 and the molds were acquired by Nimble Boats Works Inc of Tampa, Florida, who built Trane's Peep Hen design. Nimble Boats remained in business in 2022, but no longer produced sailboats.

In his 2010 book, The Sailor's Book of Small Cruising Sailboats, Steve Henkel was critical of the company based on his encounters with them in the 1980s and in particular its sales staff, whom he termed "unhelpful" and the marketing department, whom he stated "made wild claims". He noted that their sales brochures were so inconsistent that he wrote, "we can't help but wonder about the accuracy of the companies claimed specifications. Be cautious before buying." He was also disdainful of a number of their designs, noting anonymous designers, under-sized rigs, lacklustre designs, poor sailing qualities and ineffective keels. He also noted that the boats were "grossly overpriced" when sold new, compared to their competitors at the time.

Boats 
Summary of boats built by Sovereign Yachts:

Sovereign 7.0 – 1980
Sovereign 17 – 1980
Sovereign 23 – 1981
Sovereign 24 – 1981
Sovereign Princess 24 – 1981
Sovereign 20 – 1982
Sovereign 26 – 1982
Sovereign 28 – 1983
Antares 17 – 1987
Captiva 35 – 1988
Captiva 240 – 1988
Bay Hen 21 – 1992
Mud Hen 17 – 1992
Peep Hen – 1992
Sanibel 18 – 1992
Sovereign 30 – 1992

See also
List of sailboat designers and manufacturers

References

Sovereign Yachts